Jay Brazeau is a Canadian actor, best known for his role as Sam Fisher in Cold Squad, as Harlan in Stargate SG-1 (1997–2007), and for voicing Uncle Quigley in Sabrina: The Animated Series. He is also known for his role as Bobby in Double Jeopardy (1999), as Referee in the Air Bud film series (1997–2003), and his film role in We're No Angels (1989).

Career
In 1992, he appeared in an episode of Street Justice and two of the first-season episodes of Highlander: The Series. In 1998 he played Harlan in Stargate: SG1 Season 01 Episode 18 and the same character in a later episode in 2001. He also played "The Lord Protector" in Season 2 Episode 15 of Stargate: Atlantis. In October 2009, he appeared as "Man in chair" in the National Arts Centre production of The Drowsy Chaperone in Ottawa. In 2009, he played a part in several scenes added for the Ultimate Cut version of Watchmen. He was a frequent co-star of Don S. Davis.

Brazeau voiced Uncle Quigley in Sabrina: The Animated Series, Mr. Pretty in The Cramp Twins and Stavros Garkos in Hurricanes. His voice credits also include two Winnipeg-produced National Film Board of Canada animated shorts, "Get a Job" and "La Salla".

He portrayed Edna Turnblad in the Arts Club Theatre Company's production of Hairspray during the 2010/2011 season. Brazeau based his performance as Edna on his mother and an adult neighbor from his childhood nicknamed Fat Kay.

Personal life
On May 12, 2011, Brazeau suffered a minor stroke while changing costumes backstage 30 minutes into a preview performance of Hairspray. His role was filled by Andy Toth during his absence. Brazeau missed 36 performances before making a full recovery and returning to the production.

Filmography

Film

Television

References

External links

Profile at northernstars.ca
Biography at TVGuide.com

Living people
Franco-Manitoban people
Male actors from Winnipeg
Canadian male film actors
Canadian male television actors
Canadian male stage actors
Canadian male voice actors
Year of birth missing (living people)